The Cat Who Ate Danish Modern is the second novel in Lilian Jackson Braun's The Cat Who... series, published in 1967. This book introduces Yum Yum, who became a permanent character in the series.

Plot introduction

Qwilleran, a reporter for the Daily Fluxion, and Koko, his Siamese cat with strange talents, are settling into Qwill's newest assignment—a magazine specializing in interior decorating. His first assignment leads him to David Lyke and his partner, Starkweather. David introduces him to George Tait and his Swiss wife, who had paid him to decorate their home in Muggy Swamp, an ultra rich neighborhood. George Tait is a collector of jade and he enthusiastically allows Odd Bunsen, a photographer, to take pictures of them. A day after the article comes out, the Tait mansion is robbed and Mrs. Tait is dead of a heart attack.

On the other hand, Qwill meets David's clientele and his decorator friends, including rich banker Harry Noyton and his ex-wife, Natalie. He is traveling to Europe so he offers to rent out his apartment to Qwill. He moves into his expensive apartment, but Koko starts eating fabric off the expensive furniture. Also, he bites Alacoque Wright, the new lady in Qwill's life. He also finds that Harry Noyton knew Mrs. Tait and that he is in Denmark.

He suspected sabotage by the Morning Rampage when a house he covers for his second assignment gets raided. For his third article, he published David Lyke's apartment but he is found dead by Koko and Odd Bunsen. He suspected the Japanese chef since David Lyke had Japan's national treasures.

He finally meet David's ex-friend and rival, John Baker, who tells him that David was an orphan who was a self made interior decorator. However, he also charmed the ladies and talked bad about his friends. When Qwill finally reads the Tait file and looks closely at a picture Koko licks, the pieces fall into place.

Tait made some really bad business decisions and so, he was near bankruptcy.
His jades were insured and he could get a lot of money if they were stolen
Mrs. Tait's family were scientists and needed funding for new products
David was murdered by Natalie Noyton since she assumed he would marry her after she got a divorce. When he didn't, she committed homicide-suicide.
Mrs Tait had asked Harry Noyton to invest in her family before her death

When Qwill arrives at Tait's, to pick up Yum Yum, an orphan Siamese, he finds the jades in a secret compartment of a shelf. George Tait is not happy and tries to smash in his skull. Koko trips him and saves Q's life.

Throughout the book, colors are described in terms of food, such as mushroom, oatmeal or pea soup, but no comment is made about this.

Characters

Jim Qwilleran
A 6' 2" journalist with a sexy mustache, who was a former crime investigator and is now in charge of Gracious Abodes, a magazine about interior decoration.

Koko
A very intelligent Siamese cat who owns Qwill and has a nose for crime investigation. He starts eating fabric off the furniture because of loneliness.

Yum Yum
A dainty, aloof Siamese cat who becomes Koko's companion after Qwill adopts her. She is very spoiled by Mrs. Tait. But George Tait kicks her out of the house after her death.

George Verning Tait
An enthusiast of white jade, who lives in Muddy Swamp. He had made a lot of bad business decisions and had ended up almost bankrupt. He is a famous womanizer and had a child with a servant. He dislikes cats and he hated the Daily Fluxion even more for not hushing up a scandal years ago. He suffers from ulcers and in the end, it is established that he hid the jades himself to get the insurance money and make the Daily Fluxion look bad.

Arch Riker
Editor of the Daily Fluxion. Childhood friend of Qwill. Married to his high school sweetheart, Rosie.

Signe Tait
Wife of George Tait. Loves her Siamese cat. Frail for 20 years until her death. Has a temper. Aristocratic family from Sweden and Denmark, who are scientists working on zero calorie beer. She asked Harry Noyton to sponsor her family's research. Dies after an argument with her husband.

Harry Noyton
Banker and ex-husband of Natalie. Has an apartment at The Waffle, which he rents to Qwill. Has two college sons. Owns a lot of the financial sector in town. Sponsor of Signe Tait's family.

Natalie Noyton
Overweight, polite, cheerful, and loves to weave rugs. She asked for a divorce without any alimony or properties from Harry and gave up custody of her children. She kills David Lyke and then herself when he refuses to marry her. She is harmless and silly and Koko approved of her.

David Lyke
An orphan from the wrong side of the tracks. 30ish. He is a self-made interior decorator. Womanizer. Charming. Flirt. Connoisseur of Japanese art, illegally gained. Bleaches his hair white. Partner of Starkweather. Ex-friend and rival of John Baker. Backstabber. Has an excellent Japanese cook. Murdered by Natalie Noyton.

Starkweather
Businessman who has invested in Lyke's business. Clueless about him.

1967 American novels
Ate Danish Modern
E. P. Dutton books
Novels about cats